The Cahill Stadium was an arena in Summerside, Prince Edward Island designed for ice hockey events and was home to the Summerside Western Capitals hockey team, who won a Royal Bank Cup in the building in 1997. In March 2007 the building was closed to make way for the new Consolidated Credit Union Place, a multimillion-dollar facility consisting of a much larger ice venue with close to 4,000 stadium seats.

Though the building no longer stands, its memories remain in the minds of residents of Summerside. The Summerside Western Capitals hosted the Royal Bank Cup in Cahill Stadium in 1997, only winning 1 game in the round robin stage before coming back with an overtime win and then beating the South Surrey Eagles by a score of 4–3 in front of almost 4,000 people, although the stadium capacity was really only 1,200.

In the last game held at the stadium in February 2007, 1,322 fans watched the Western Capitals defeat the Charlottetown Abbies 7–3.

Cahill Stadium also had bowling lanes and a second facility called Steele Arena.

Buildings and structures in Summerside, Prince Edward Island
Defunct indoor arenas in Canada
Defunct indoor ice hockey venues in Canada
Sport in Summerside, Prince Edward Island
Sports venues in Prince Edward Island